This is a list of flags used in Chile. For more information about the national flag, visit the article Flag of Chile.

National flags

Presidential standard

Ambassador flag

Military flags

Chilean Army

Chilean Navy

Chilean Air Force

Police flags

Vexillology Association flags

Regions

Unofficial regional flags

Communes

Political flags

Ethnic groups flags

Mapuche territories

Historical flags

House flags of Chilean freight companies

Burgees of Chile

Antarctic base flags

Political flags

Sources 
The Flags of Chile. Flags of the World
 National symbols of Chile. Chilean Government Official Website 
Orígenes, mitos y hechos interesantes sobre los símbolos patrios chilenos 
Decree 1534 of 1967 about National Symbols of Chile 
Reino de Araucanía y Patagonia - Portal Mapuche 

Chile
Flags of Chile
Flags
Chilean culture